Zoran Kuntić (Serbian Cyrillic: Зоран Kунтић; born 23 March 1967 in Subotica) is a Serbian football player of Croat origin.

Club career
He started his playing career at the local team FK Spartak Subotica before moving to FK Vojvodina. He then signed with Posco Atoms in South Korea. In 1993, he moved to Hungary playing for Kecskeméti TE, FC Fehérvár and Ferencvárosi TC. With Ferencváros, he participated in the 1995/1996 season of the UEFA Champions League, scoring a crucial goal in the qualifying match against RSC Anderlecht in Brussels, which resulted in the 1-0 victory for Ferencváros, and the 1-1 draw on the rematch in Budapest meant the advance of the team to the group stages. With this result Ferencváros remained the only Hungarian team to qualify for the Champions League group phase until the 2009–10 season.

Kuntić later moved to AEK Larnaca in Cyprus, then returned to Hungary and played with Vasas SC and Videoton before returning to Serbia and finishing his career at FK Spartak Subotica in 2000.

Managerial career
After his retirement he became a coach, first at Diósgyőri VTK and afterwards with his old club Ferencváros. In 2009, he coached FK Hajduk Kula in the Serbian SuperLiga.

In July 2008 he was nominated as the chairman for FK Zlatibor Voda in his birth town Subotica.

References

External links

1967 births
Living people
Sportspeople from Subotica
Serbian footballers
Yugoslav footballers
Serbian expatriate footballers
Association football forwards
FK Spartak Subotica players
FK Vojvodina players
AEK Larnaca FC players
Pohang Steelers players
Cypriot First Division players
Nemzeti Bajnokság I players
K League 1 players
Expatriate footballers in Cyprus
Expatriate footballers in Hungary
Ferencvárosi TC footballers
Serbian expatriate sportspeople in Hungary
Serbian football managers
Diósgyőri VTK managers
Ferencvárosi TC managers
Expatriate football managers in Bosnia and Herzegovina
Serbian expatriate sportspeople in Bosnia and Herzegovina
Premier League of Bosnia and Herzegovina managers
NK Zvijezda Gradačac managers
Serbian SuperLiga managers
Croats of Vojvodina
SZEOL SC
Expatriate football managers in Hungary